This is a list of the college football teams with the most wins in the history of college football as measured in both total wins and winning percentage, as of March 24, 2022.  It includes teams from the NCAA Division I-Football Bowl Subdivision (FBS), Division I-Football Championship Subdivision (FCS), Division II, and Division III.

Measured in winning percentage, the Mary Hardin-Baylor Crusaders (Division III) lead all other programs with a winning percentage of .859. The leaders in winning percentage of teams in the Division I Subdivisions (FBS and FCS) and Division II are the Ohio State Buckeyes (.733), Yale Bulldogs (.698), and the Grand Valley State Lakers (.744), respectively.

The lists below reflect official results after vacated and forfeited games.

Key

Teams ranked by total wins

The following list displays the records for the top 100 football programs by total wins in the NCAA. The last tied game in college football was in 1995, with overtime rules coming into effect in the 1996 season.

Teams ranked by winning percentage
The following list displays the record for all NCAA football programs with a winning percentage of .667 or higher, with a minimum of 250 games. In the event of a tie, the team with more wins is listed first.

Updated based on 2022 NCAA Football Records for Division I (FBS & FCS), Division II, and Division III representing data as of Aug 20, 2022.

See also

 NCAA Division I FBS football win–loss records
 NCAA Division I FCS football win–loss records
 List of teams with the most victories in NCAA Division I men's college basketball

References

Lists of college football team records